Leninsky District is an administrative district (raion), one of the thirty-three in Volgograd Oblast, Russia. As a municipal division, it is incorporated as Leninsky Municipal District. It is located in the east of the oblast. Its administrative center is the town of Leninsk. Population:  31,483 (2002 Census);  The population of Leninsk accounts for 51.0% of the district's total population.

References

Notes

Sources

Districts of Volgograd Oblast